The Polish Mathematical Society is the main professional society of Polish mathematicians and represents Polish mathematics within the European Mathematical Society (EMS) and the International Mathematical Union (IMU).

History

The society was established in Kraków, Poland on 2 April 1919 . It was originally called the Mathematical Society in Kraków, the name was changed to the Polish Mathematical Society on 21 April 1920. It was founded by 16 mathematicians,  Stanisław Zaremba, Franciszek Leja, Alfred Rosenblatt, Stefan Banach and Otto Nikodym were among them. 

Ever since its foundation, the society's main activity was to bring mathematicians together by means of organizing conferences and lectures. The second main activity is the publication of its annals Annales Societatis Mathematicae Polonae, consisting of: 
 Series 1: Commentationes Mathematicae 
 Series 2: Wiadomości Matematyczne ("Mathematical News"), in Polish
 Series 3: Mathematica Applicanda (formerly Matematyka Stosowana until 2012)
 Series 4: Fundamenta Informaticae
 Series 5: Didactica Mathematicae
 Series 6: Antiquitates Mathematicae
 Series 7: Delta, in Polish

The annals are also known under the Polish name Roczniki Polskiego Towarzystwa Matematycznego and under the English name Polish Mathematical Society Annals.

Stefan Banach Prize 
The Polish Mathematical Society has awarded the Stefan Banach Prize to the following recipients:

International Stefan Banach Prize 
The International Stefan Banach Prize is an annual award presented by the Mathematical Society to mathematicians for best doctoral dissertations in the mathematical sciences. Its aim is to "promote and financially support the most promising young researchers" in the field of mathematics. It was founded in 2009 and is named in honour of a renowned Polish mathematician Stefan Banach (1892-1945). The laureates of the award also receive a cash prize of zl 25,000 (c.$6,500). List of laureates:

 2009: Tomasz Elsner
 2010: Jakub Gismatullin
 2011: Łukasz Pańkowski
 2012: Andras Mathe
 2013: Marcin Pilipczuk
 2014: Dan Petersen
 2015: Joonas Ilmavirta
 2016: Adam Kanigowski
 2017: Anna Szymusiak

Presidents of the Polish Mathematical Society

See also
European Mathematical Society
Polish Chemical Society
Polish Physical Society

References 

 
 Website of the journal Wiadomości Matematyczne, edited by the Polish Mathematical Society. Retrieved on January 9, 2009.

External links
 Polish Mathematical Society website (in Polish)
 

Scientific societies based in Poland
Mathematical societies
1917 establishments in Poland
Polish awards